St. Cecilia is a Baroque sculpture by Stefano Maderno in the church of Santa Cecilia in Trastevere, Rome. This sculpture was created after the incorrupt body of St. Cecilia, a second-century Roman martyr, was found entombed under the altar of the church in 1600. After the discovery of the corpse, Cardinal Paolo Emilio Sfrondrato commissioned a renovation of the church, including a new tomb. Maderno's sculpture replicates the position in which the preserved body was discovered.

The Artist

St. Cecilia

Provenance

Sources 

 Neuman, Robert. Baroque and Rococo Art and Architecture. Upper Saddle River: Pearson, 2013.
 Harris, Ann Sutherland. Seventeenth-Century Art and Architecture. London: Laurence King Publishing, 2008.

Notes 

Baroque sculptures
Sculptures in Rome
Sculptures of saints